Isaiah 27 is the twenty-seventh chapter of the Book of Isaiah in the Hebrew Bible or the Old Testament of the Christian Bible. This book contains the prophecies attributed to the prophet Isaiah, and is one of the Books of the Prophets. Chapters 24-27 of Isaiah constitute one continuous poetical prophecy, sometimes called the "Isaiah Apocalypse".

Text 
The original text was written in Hebrew language. This chapter is divided into 13 verses.

Textual witnesses
Some early manuscripts containing the text of this chapter in Hebrew are found among the Dead Sea Scrolls, i.e., the Isaiah Scroll (1Qlsa; complete; 356-100 BCE), and of the Masoretic Text tradition, which includes Codex Cairensis (895 CE), the Petersburg Codex of the Prophets (916), Aleppo Codex (10th century), Codex Leningradensis (1008).

There is also a translation into Koine Greek known as the Septuagint, made in the last few centuries BCE. Extant ancient manuscripts of the Septuagint version include Codex Vaticanus (B; B; 4th century), Codex Sinaiticus (S; BHK: S; 4th century), Codex Alexandrinus (A; A; 5th century) and Codex Marchalianus (Q; Q; 6th century).

Parashot
The parashah sections listed here are based on the Aleppo Codex. Isaiah 27 is a part of the Prophecies about Judah and Israel (Isaiah 24–35). {P}: open parashah; {S}: closed parashah.
 {P} 27:1 {S} 27:2-6 {P} 27:7-11 {P} 27:12 {P} 27:13 {P}

Verse 1
 In that day the Lord with his sore and great and strong sword
 shall punish leviathan the piercing serpent, 
 even leviathan that crooked serpent; 
 and he shall slay the dragon that is in the sea.
The word "Leviathan" is capitalised in many English translations but lower case in the King James Version and American Standard Version.

Verse 2
New International Version
Sing about a fruitful vineyard 
The Septuagint and some other manuscripts, followed by the Revised Standard Version and New Century Version, refer to a "pleasant vineyard". A. F. Kirkpatrick, in the Cambridge Bible for Schools and Colleges, prefers the word-order: "Pleasant vineyard! Sing ye of it".

Verse 4
Jerusalem Bible
I am angry no longer
King James Version
Who would set the briers and thorns against me in battle? I would go through them, I would burn them together.
The Good News Translation offers "I am no longer angry with the vineyard" as an interpretation of this verse. The Septuagint has a different text:There is no woman that has not taken hold of it; who will set me to watch stubble in the field? Because of this enemy I have set her aside; therefore on this account the Lord has done all that he appointed.

Verse 5
Jerusalem BibleLet them make their peace with meLet them make their peace with me''

See also
Assyria
Brook of Egypt
Jacob
Jerusalem
Leviathan
Nile
Related Bible parts: Job 41, Isaiah 2, Isaiah 24, Isaiah 25, Isaiah 26, Jeremiah 48, Revelation 19, Revelation 21

References

Bibliography

External links

Jewish
Isaiah 27 Original Hebrew with Parallel English

Christian
Isaiah 27 English Translation with Parallel Latin Vulgate

27